Michael Gostigian (born February 21, 1963) is a former American modern pentathlete. He competed at the 1988, 1992, and 1996 Summer Olympics. His best Olympic performance was in 1992, when he placed ninth individually and fourth with the American team.

Gostigian held the national pentathlon title in 1992-95 and won the 1992 World Cup. He attended University of Notre Dame, where he was NCAA champion in fencing in 1986. For eight years he trained with the US National swimming team. After college, Gostigian earned a master's degree in international management, and later worked as a personal trainer. He is married to the Olympic fencer Sharon Monplaisir.

References

External links
 

1963 births
Living people
American male modern pentathletes
Olympic modern pentathletes of the United States
Modern pentathletes at the 1988 Summer Olympics
Modern pentathletes at the 1992 Summer Olympics
Modern pentathletes at the 1996 Summer Olympics
Malvern Preparatory School alumni
People from Newtown Township, Delaware County, Pennsylvania
Sportspeople from Delaware County, Pennsylvania
20th-century American people